Palmarola is a craggy, mostly uninhabited island in the Tyrrhenian Sea off the west coast of Italy. In antiquity it was known as Palmaria.

Palmarola has an extremely rocky coast dotted with natural grottos, bays, cliffs, and crags. The island is primarily a nature reserve, but there are a handful of ports where boats can land and several restaurants that cater to tourists during the summer season. Palmarola has a few small beaches.

The famous French explorer and oceanographer Jacques-Yves Cousteau appointed Palmarola as "The most Beautiful Island in the Mediterranean Sea"

Pope Silverius was exiled to and died on Palmarola in 538.

Points of interest 
 San Silverio Shrine, a site where miracles have been confirmed, access to the site is somewhat difficult.
 Cava Mazzella, a natural cave

See also
 List of islands of Italy

References

Bibliography

External links
Italian Tourist Board, information of the Pontine Islands

Islands of Lazio